Streptomyces intermedius is a bacterium species from the genus of Streptomyces which was isolated from soil.

See also 
 List of Streptomyces species

References

Further reading

External links
Type strain of Streptomyces intermedius at BacDive -  the Bacterial Diversity Metadatabase	

intermedius
Bacteria described in 1953